The 5th Sasebo Special Naval Landing Force (5th Sasebo SNLF) was an infantry battalion of the Imperial Japanese Navy's Special Naval Landing Forces.

Formed at the Sasebo Naval District, the 5th Sasebo SNLF participated in the invasion of Buna-Gona, the New Guinea Campaign and the battle of Milne Bay.

Citations

References

Special Landing Forces of the Imperial Japanese Navy
Military units and formations of Japan in World War II